Louellen is an unincorporated community and coal town in  Harlan County, Kentucky, United States. Their post office  is closed.

References

Unincorporated communities in Harlan County, Kentucky
Unincorporated communities in Kentucky
Coal towns in Kentucky